Paolo Falconieri (1638–1704) was an Italian architect, painter and mathematician, from a noble family of Florence, whose intellectual interests were wide-ranging, one of the virtuosi of the first scientific century.

He was a member of the court of Cosimo III de' Medici, Grand Duke of Tuscany, and a prominent member of the Florentine Accademia del Cimento, selected in 1668 to accompany the secretary Lorenzo Magalotti in presenting to the Royal Society in London and to Charles II, copies of the newly printed reports of experimental science in Florence, Saggi di naturali esperienze. He produced a plan for enlarging Palazzo Pitti in 1681.

Notes 

Architects from Florence
Italian Baroque architects
17th-century Italian architects
18th-century Italian architects
1638 births
1704 deaths